Krystian Jan Ochman (born 19 July 1999), known professionally as Ochman, is a Polish-American singer-songwriter. He rose to fame after winning the eleventh season of The Voice of Poland and represented Poland in the Eurovision Song Contest 2022 with the song "River".

Early life
Ochman was born in Melrose, Massachusetts to a Polish family. He started to take singing lessons during his high school years and later played the role of the prince in a musical production of Cinderella. Ochman graduated from Thomas Sprigg Wootton High School in Rockville, Maryland in 2017. Following his high school graduation, he enrolled at the Karol Szymanowski Academy of Music in Katowice.

Career

2020–2021: The Voice of Poland and Ochman
 
In 2020, he auditioned for the eleventh season of The Voice of Poland with the song "Beneath Your Beautiful" by Labrinth and Emeli Sandé, getting chair turns from Michał Szpak and Edyta Górniak. He joined Michał Szpak's team and won the show on 5 December 2020. After the competition, he signed a contract with Universal Music Polska. 

His first single, "Światłocienie", was performed on The Voice of Poland in late 2020. The song was certified gold in Poland on 4 April 2021. He released his self-titled debut studio album, Ochman, on 19 November 2021. The album peaked at number 5 on Poland's charts on 3 March 2022.

2022–present: Eurovision Song Contest 
In early 2022, Telewizja Polska (TVP) announced that he would compete in Poland's national final, Tu bije serce Europy! Wybieramy hit na Eurowizję, with the song "River". The song was written by Ochman himself along with Ashley Hicklin, Adam Wiśniewski, and Mikołaj Trybulec. On 19 February 2022, he won the national final and represented Poland in the Eurovision Song Contest 2022 in Turin. He finished 12th in the final with 151 points.

Personal life
Ochman is the grandson of the Polish tenor Wiesław Ochman. 

He is a dual citizen of Poland and of the United States. He currently resides in both Katowice and Warsaw.

Discography

Studio albums

Extended plays

Singles

Promotional singles

Awards and nominations

See also
Poland in the Eurovision Song Contest
Music of Poland

References

1999 births
Living people
People from Melrose, Massachusetts
21st-century Polish singers
The Voice (franchise) contestants
The Voice (franchise) winners
Musicians from Warsaw
Eurovision Song Contest entrants of 2022
Eurovision Song Contest entrants for Poland
American people of Polish descent
People from Rockville, Maryland